La maestra Méndez is a Mexican tv serie produced by Televisa for Canal de las Estrellas in 1971.

Cast 
Lucía Méndez as La maestra Méndez
Víctor Junco
Félix González

References

External links 

Mexican telenovelas
1971 telenovelas
Televisa telenovelas
Spanish-language telenovelas
1971 Mexican television series debuts
1971 Mexican television series endings